Chenaqchi-ye Sofla (also Romanized as Chenāqchī-ye Soflá,  Chanāqchī-ye Soflá, and Chonāqchī-ye Soflá; also known as Chanāqchī-ye Pā’īn and Chunāqcheh Sufla) is a village in Duzaj Rural District, Kharqan District, Zarandieh County, Markazi Province, Iran. At the 2006 census, its population was 377, in 89 families.

References 

Populated places in Zarandieh County